Sebastian Gazurek (born 18 June 1990 in Istebna) is a Polish cross-country skier. He competed at the FIS Nordic World Ski Championships 2013 in Val di Fiemme, and at the 2014 Winter Olympics in Sochi, in 15 kilometre classical and 4 × 10 kilometre relay.

References

External links

1990 births
Living people
Cross-country skiers at the 2014 Winter Olympics
Polish male cross-country skiers
Olympic cross-country skiers of Poland
People from Cieszyn Silesia
People from Cieszyn County